Janko Kráľ (24 April 1822 in Liptovský Svätý Mikuláš (now Liptovský Mikuláš, Slovakia) – 23 May 1876 in Zlaté Moravce) was one of the most significant and most radical Slovak romantic poets of the Ľudovít Štúr generation and a national activist.

Because of his obscure personality, it is not known exactly what he looked like, but several more or less popular supposed pictures of him exist. One of them was used as a model for the statue of Janko Kráľ located in a park called Sad Janka Kráľa (literally Janko Kráľ Garden) in Bratislava - Petržalka. He is buried in the National Cemetery in Martin.

He was one of the first poets to start writing in the modern Slovak language standard freshly codified (in 1843) by Ľudovít Štúr and his companions. There is a school with his name, Gymnázium Janka Kráľa, located in Zlaté Moravce.

Works

Zverbovaný
Zabitý
Zakliata panna vo Váhu a divný Janko
Moja pieseň
Pieseň bez mena
Orol
Piesne
Potecha
Pán v trní
Pieseň
Duma bratislavská
Kríž a čiapka
Choč
Krajinská pieseň
Slovo
Duma slovenská
Krakoviaky dobrovoľníkove
Jarná Pieseň

References

1822 births
1876 deaths
Writers from Liptovský Mikuláš
Slovak poets
19th-century poets
Burials at National Cemetery in Martin
People of the Slovak Uprising of 1848–49